United Nations Security Council Resolution 300, adopted unanimously on October 12, 1971, after supposed violations of Zambian air space by planes of the South African Air Force the Security Council reiterated its stance on sovereignty and territorial integrity and called on South Africa to respect Zambia's.  The Council declared that in the event South Africa further violated Zambia's sovereignty it would meet again to examine the situation in accordance with the relevant provisions of United Nations Charter.

The meeting took place at the request of Zambia, who wrote a letter to the Security Council on October 6, after alleged violations along the Caprivi Strip. It was supported by 48 states.

See also
 List of United Nations Security Council Resolutions 201 to 300 (1965–1971)
 South African Border War
 United Nations Security Council Resolution 393

References

External links
 
Text of the Resolution at undocs.org

 0300
20th century in South Africa
1970 in Africa
 0300
 0300
October 1971 events
South Africa–Zambia relations